Reigate Priory Football Club is a football club based in Reigate, Surrey, England. They are currently members of the Mid-Sussex League Premiership and play at Park Lane.

History

The club can trace its history as far back as April 1870, not long after The Football Association was formed in 1863.  In 1871 the club was one of only 15 teams that played for a £20 silver trophy, the first ever FA Challenge Cup competition; the club's share was £1 1s, and the club made 2/6 profit over the season thanks to £6 2/6 worth of income.  The team were drawn in the first round against the Royal Engineers, who went on to lose in the final. Reigate Priory withdrew before the game, and Royal Engineers were awarded a walkover.

Reigate Priory was also present when the Surrey County F.A. (founded in 1877) decided to become affiliated to the Football Association on 16 March 1882.  The club was one of the original 10 teams present at the meeting that took place in Guildford.  At the same time, a County Senior Cup competition was introduced.  The first winners of this trophy, Priory were victorious six times in the competition before the end of the 19th century.

The club is one of the oldest football clubs in the world still playing on its original ground.  It numbers among its former members WW Read, with whom it enjoyed a long and happy association right through his sporting life.

In 2008 the club became founder members of the Surrey Elite Intermediate League.

Ground
Reigate Priory 1st and Reserves teams play their home games at Park Lane, Reigate, Surrey, RH2 8JX.

The A and B teams play their home games at Netherne Amateur Sports Club, Woodplace Lane, Coulsdon, Surrey, CR5 1NB

Current teams

Adult sides

First Team

Reserve Team
Mid-Sussex League Div 2 North

A Team
Mid-Sussex League Div 5 North

B Team
Mid-Sussex League Div 6 North

Vets Over35
Friendlies

Youth sides
U9 Eagles
U9 Falcons
U9 Hawks
U9 Harriers
U9 Kestrels
U9 Ospreys

U10 Eagles
U10 Falcons
U10 Hawks
U10 Harriers
U10 Kestrels
U10 Ospreys
U10 Buzzards

U11 Eagles
U11 Falcons
U11 Hawks
U11 Harriers
U11 Kestrels
U11 Ospreys
U11 Buzzards

U12 Eagles
U12 Falcons
U12 Hawks
U12 Harriers
U12 Kestrels
U12 Ospreys

U13 Eagles
U13 Falcons
U13 Hawks
U13 Harriers
U13 Ospreys

U14 Eagles
U14 Falcons
U14 Hawks
U14 Harriers
U14 Kestrels
U14 Ospreys
U14 Buzzards

U15 Eagles
U15 Falcons
U15 Hawks
U15 Harriers
U15 Ospreys

U16 Eagles
U16 Falcons
U16 Hawks
U16 Harriers
U16 Ospreys

U17 Falcons
U17 Ospreys
U17 Harriers

U18 Eagles
U18 Falcons

Current management
First Team Manager
Dale Wyatt
Arun Field (Assistant)

Reserve Team Managers
Ben Smythe
Ricky De Abreu (Assistant)

A Team Managers
Tristan Davis
Danny O'Connor (Assistants)
Michael Walker (Assistants)

B Team Managers
Lee Murray
James Waller (Assistant)

Vets Over 35 Manager 
Kelvin Beckett
Nigel Lomas
Chris Comben

Honours
Surrey Senior Cup:
 Winners (6): 1882–83, 1885–86, 1890–91, 1891–92, 1893–94, 1896–97
 Runners-up (4): 1883–84, 1884–85, 1886–87, 1889-90
Redhill and District Sunday Senior Cup:
 Runners-up (1): 2014-15
Challenge International du Nord:
 Winners (1): 1910
Gray Hooper Holt LLP Mid Sussex Championship
 Winners (1): 2021–22
Gray Hooper Holt LLP Mid Sussex Stubbins Cup
 Winners (1): 2021–22

Records
FA Cup
Second Round 1874–75, 1875–76
FA Vase
First Round 1974–75, 1975–76, 1977–78

References

External links

Football clubs in England
1870 establishments in England
Association football clubs established in 1870
Southern Amateur Football League
Redhill and District Saturday Football League
Surrey Elite Intermediate Football League